James George Pritchard (February 14, 1948 - April 1, 2014) was a Canadian professional ice hockey defenceman. He was selected by the Montreal Canadiens in the first round (3rd overall) of the 1968 NHL Amateur Draft.

Pritchard played two games with the Chicago Cougars of the World Hockey Association during the 1974–75 season.

Awards
 WCJHL Second All-Star Team – 1968

References

External links

1948 births
2014 deaths
Canadian ice hockey defencemen
Chicago Cougars players
Montreal Canadiens draft picks
National Hockey League first-round draft picks
Ice hockey people from Winnipeg